Lam Sam Kaeo is a town (thesaban mueang) in Lam Luk Ka District (amphoe), Pathum Thani Province, in the Bangkok Metropolitan Region of central Thailand. In 2014, it had a population of 63,271.

References

Populated places in Pathum Thani province